is a Japanese retired footballer.

Career
Suzuki represented Blaublitz Akita, Giravanz Kitakyushu, Yokohama F. Marinos and V-Varen Nagasaki. He retired in December 2019.

Club statistics
Updated to 2 December 2018.

References

External links
Profile at Yokohama F. Marinos 
Profile at Giravanz Kitakyushu

1987 births
Living people
Ritsumeikan University alumni
Association football people from Aichi Prefecture
Japanese footballers
J1 League players
J2 League players
Japan Football League players
Blaublitz Akita players
Giravanz Kitakyushu players
Yokohama F. Marinos players
V-Varen Nagasaki players
Association football goalkeepers